Diyun a small township or small city on the rise, is located in Changlang District of Arunachal Pradesh. It got its name from a very small seasonal river by the same name. It is located at 27°31'28"N and 96°8'33"E, geographically. It is surrounded by the foothills of the Eastern Himalayas on two sides and by the Patkai Bum Range of mountains on one side.

Communities 
Diyun Circle is mostly populated by the Chakma, Hajong, and Deori people. The Singphos, Khamptis, and Chakmas are followers of Theravada Buddhism. Whereas Deoris and Hajongs follow Hinduism.

Buddhist monasteries cover Diyun town where people gather to follow the teachings of Buddha and get blessings from the Buddha the monks. The oldest monastery is Diyun Temple. The largest is Sadhanarama Vihara which is situated at Jyotsnapur Village under Diyun circle. It’s one of biggest Buddhist monasteries and tourist attractions place.

All tribes have an Indian calendar new year(Baisaki) celebration on mid of April called Bihu, Sangken, and Bizu.

References

Cities and towns in Changlang district